The 1995–96 Toronto Maple Leafs season was Toronto's 79th season in the National Hockey League (NHL).

Offseason

Regular season
The Leafs headed into the 1995–96 regular season with high hopes considering the fact the club reached the playoffs for the last three years. Pat Burns was the head coach until an eight-game losing streak (and a miserable run of 3–16–3 over January and February) led to his termination. General manager Cliff Fletcher felt that Nick Beverley could get the job done for the rest of the season and named him interim coach. The team under Beverley went an impressive 9–6–2 and clinched a playoff spot on the final day of their regular season.

 December 11, 1995: Patrick Roy earned his first victory in net as a member of the Colorado Avalanche. It was a 5-1 victory over the Toronto Maple Leafs.
 December 30, 1995: Mats Sundin scored just 6 seconds into the overtime period to give the Maple Leafs a 4-3 road win over the St. Louis Blues. It would prove to be the fastest regular-season overtime goal ever scored and has been matched twice since.

Season standings

Schedule and results

Playoffs

Round 1: Toronto Maple Leafs vs. St. Louis Blues

Player statistics

Regular season
Scoring

Goaltending

Playoffs
Scoring

Goaltending

Transactions
The Maple Leafs have been involved in the following transactions during the 1995-96 season.

Trades

Waivers

Free agents

Awards and records
 Felix Potvin, Molson Cup (most game star selections for Toronto Maple Leafs).

Draft picks
Toronto's draft picks at the 1995 NHL Entry Draft held at the Edmonton Coliseum in Edmonton, Alberta.

Farm teams
 The Maple Leafs farm team was the St. John's Maple Leafs in St. John's, Newfoundland.

References
 Maple Leafs on Hockey Database

Toronto Maple Leafs seasons
Toronto Maple Leafs season, 1995-96
Toronto
Toronto Maple Leafs
Toronto Maple Leafs